Tooey or Tooeys may refer to:

People
Carl Spaatz (1891–1974), US Air Force general
Jim Tooey (born 1954), American actor
Colonel Tooey, tour boat operator who established a colony of feral rhesus macaque in Silver Springs
Tooey Courtemanche, CEO of Procore

Fictional characters
Tooey, character in Weebleville
Tooey Brown, character in Leave It to Beaver
Tooey Ookami, character in Molly of Denali

Places
Tooeys Creek, stream in Renfrew County, Ontario, Canada
Tooeys Lake, lake in Renfrew County, Ontario, Canada

See also
Tooheys Brewery, Australian brewery
Tuohy (disambiguation)